W43DL-D, virtual and UHF digital channel 43, was a low-powered religious independent television station licensed to Montgomery, Alabama, United States. The station was owned by Total Praise Channel, Inc. The station's studios were located at 5600 Carriage Hills Drive in Montgomery.

The station's license was cancelled by the Federal Communications Commission on February 8, 2022.

References

External links

Total Praise Channel Official Website
Total Praise Channel on Facebook

Religious television stations in the United States
43DL-D
Low-power television stations in the United States
Television channels and stations established in 2014
2014 establishments in Alabama
Defunct television stations in the United States
Television channels and stations disestablished in 2022
2022 disestablishments in Alabama
43DL-D